"Tsunagu" is the 52nd single by Japanese boy band Arashi. It was released on June 28, 2017 under their record label J Storm. "Tsunagu" is the theme song for the film Shinobi no Kuni starring Arashi member Satoshi Ohno. The single sold over 380,000 copies in its first week and topped the weekly Oricon Singles Chart. The single was certified Platinum by the Recording Industry Association of Japan (RIAJ).

Single information
"Tsunagu" was released in two editions: a regular edition and a limited edition. The regular edition contains the B-sides "Reach for the sky ~Ten made Todoke~",  "Dakishimetai", and "Under the radar", and the instrumentals for all four tracks. The limited edition contains the music video and making-of for "Tsunagu", the B-side "Oki ni Mesu mama" and its instrumental, and a 16-page lyrics booklet . The album jacket covers for the two versions are different.

"Tsunagu" was used as the theme song for the film Shinobi no Kuni starring Arashi member Satoshi Ohno. "Reach for the sky ~Ten made Todoke~" was used as the campaign song for JAL "Early Bird Campaign 2017".

Chart performance
"Tsunagu" debuted at number twenty-four on the Billboard Japan Hot 100 chart on May 29, 2017. It dropped to number fifty-four in June and rose to number eighteen on July 3. The following week, the song climbed seventeen spots and peaked at number one. The single debuted at number one on the Oricon daily singles chart selling, 225,153 copies upon its release and selling 389,311 copies by the end of the week, topping the Oricon weekly singles chart. The single debuted at number one on the Billboard Japan's top single sales chart selling 414,810 copies in its first week. In June 2017, the single was certified platinum by RIAJ for shipments of 250,000 units.

Track listing

Charts and certifications

Weekly charts

Certifications

Release history

References

External links
Tsunagu product information
Hard Copy Sales Certifications (RIAJ)

2017 songs
Arashi songs